Sir Edward Whipple Bancroft Morrison,  (6 July 1867 – 28 May 1925) was a Canadian journalist and Major General in the Canadian Army during World War I.

Biography 
Born in London, Ontario, he worked as a journalist for the Hamilton Spectator and later as editor-in-chief of the Ottawa Citizen. He served with the Royal Canadian Artillery in South Africa during the Boer War, where he received the Distinguished Service Order. Later, in World War I he served with the Canadian Expeditionary Force and was promoted to major-general in 1918.  Morrison had command of all artillery at the battle of Vimy Ridge.  After the war, he continued to serve with the Canadian Army until he retired in 1924.

He was made a Knight Commander of the Order of St Michael and St George in June 1919.

References
Biography at the Dictionary of Canadian Biography Online

1867 births
1925 deaths
Canadian Militia officers
Canadian generals of World War I
Canadian newspaper editors
Canadian male journalists
Canadian Knights Commander of the Order of St Michael and St George
Canadian Companions of the Distinguished Service Order
Journalists from Ontario
Canadian military personnel from Ontario
Canadian Expeditionary Force officers
Royal Regiment of Canadian Artillery officers